In molecular biology, snoRNA SNORD70 (HBII-234) is a non-coding RNA that belongs to the C/D family of snoRNAs.
It is the human orthologue of the mouse MBII-234 and is predicted to guide 2'O-ribose methylation of the small 18S rRNA on position A512.
It is hosted, together with HBII-95, by the core C/D box snoRNA protein encoding gene NOP5/NOP58.

References

External links 
 
 
 Entry in HGNC database

Small nuclear RNA